Hesby is a village in the Norwegian island of Finnøy in Rogaland county, on the western coast of Norway. Hesby is a historical seat of power dating back to the Middle Ages. 

Hesby is also the site of Hesby Church which dates back to around the year 1100 A.D.

Finnøy